Ocimum americanum, known as American basil, lime basil, or hoary basil, is a species of annual herb in the family Lamiaceae. Despite the misleading name, it is native to Africa, the Indian Subcontinent, China, and Southeast Asia. The species is naturalized in Queensland, Christmas Island, and parts of tropical America.

Description and uses 
It is a hairy annual herbaceous plant that grows up to 40 cm tall, with toothed, opposite leaves and small, white or purple flowers in clusters. The plant has a long taproot that extends deep into the ground. The entire plant is highly aromatic, with an odor comparable to citrus. As such, it can be used for culinary purposes in similar ways to sweet basil (O. basilicum). It is also used for essential oil and is often considered indistinguishable from the closely related O. basilicum by some. The plant has medicinal properties as well.

References

External links

americanum
Plants described in 1755
Flora of Africa
Flora of Asia
Medicinal plants
Herbs
Taxa named by Carl Linnaeus